Ioannis Davos (1918 – 15 January 2008) was a Hellenic Army officer who rose to the rank of full general, and held the posts of Chief of the Hellenic Army General Staff and of the Armed Forces High Command.

He was born in the village of Agios Georgios in Messenia, in 1918. He entered the Hellenic Army Academy, but the outbreak of the Greco-Italian War on 28 October 1940 interrupted his studies: he was commissioned as a second lieutenant and participated in the campaign, being seriously wounded at the Battle of Trebeshina. Following the collapse of the Greek army during the German invasion of Greece and the subsequent occupation, he was active in the Greek Resistance, forming armed guerrilla groups in the Triphylia-Olympia area and being again wounded. He was named a lieutenant upon Liberation in 1944, and participated in the subsequent Greek Civil War as a company commander with the rank of Captain (1946). He was promoted to Major (1951), Lt. Colonel (1956), Colonel (1967, retroactive to 1960), Brigadier (1970). He commanded the 30th Infantry Regiment and the 11th Infantry Division, as well as serving in various staff positions - including two stints in Cyprus, in 1964-66 as head of the Operations Bureau and in 1969-70 as Chief of Staff of the Cypriot National Guard - and teaching in the Supreme War School.

In 1973 he was promoted to lieutenant general and sent to command the III Army Corps in Macedonia. During the July 1974 crisis, brought about by the coup against Cypriot president Makarios III sponsored by the then-ruling Greek military regime and the subsequent Turkish invasion, Davos thus found himself in command of the most powerful formation in the Hellenic Army. It was partly the threat of his active intervention that forced the Armed Forces leadership to topple junta strongman Dimitrios Ioannidis and surrender power to a civilian government under Konstantinos Karamanlis. Shortly after, on 19 August 1974, Davos was appointed as Chief of the Hellenic Army General Staff, from which position he helped ensure the loyalty of the army to the new regime, which was still under threat by hardline officers. He continued in this post until 13 September 1976, when he was promoted to full General and placed as Chief of the Armed Forces High Command. He retired on 10 January 1980, and subsequently served as Deputy Minister for National Defence in January–May 1981.

He died on 15 January 2008. He was married and had three children.

References

1910s births
2008 deaths
Hellenic Army generals
Chiefs of the Hellenic Army General Staff
Recipients of the Cross of Valour (Greece)
Chiefs of the Hellenic National Defence General Staff
People from Koroni